In the sport of cricket, a Player of the Series or Player of the Tournament  award is given to the outstanding player, almost always the one who makes the most impact, series and tournament,

Test

Most Player of the Series awards

ODI

Most Player of the Series awards

T20I

Most Player of the Series awards

References

Cricket awards and rankings